First Church of Christ, Scientist is a Christian Science church in Ottawa, Ontario, Canada.

History

The church was first organized in 1899. Its current Italianate style building in Centretown was designed by John Pritchard MacLaren (architect) 1913–14. The church is one of only a few such buildings in Ottawa. The church maintains a Reading Room on Laurier Avenue in downtown Ottawa.

References

External links
Official site

Churches in Ottawa
Christian Science churches in Canada